Marcella Boveri (née O'Grady; October 7, 1863 – October 24, 1950) was an American biologist. She was married to the German biologist Theodor Boveri (1862–1915). Their daughter Margret Boveri (1900–1975) became one of the best-known post-war German journalists.

Life
She was born Marcella O'Grady in Boston, the daughter of Irish immigrants. She attended Girls' High School in Boston. She studied with William Thompson Sedgwick at the Massachusetts Institute of Technology, where she became the first woman to receive a degree in biology from MIT. After she completed her post-graduate studies in Harvard University O'Grady worked as an assistant to the zoologist Edmund Beecher Wilson at Bryn Mawr College in Pennsylvania. She was awarded the Fellowship in Biology for 1887-1889 for advanced study at Bryn Mawr College, a very rare award for a woman in those days. In 1889 she transferred as associate professor to Vassar College, and became full professor there in 1893. During this time O'Grady was very much in favour of encouraging women to study and advance themselves in higher education.

In 1896 she visited Würzburg, at a time when women were not allowed to study at university in Germany, where she met her future husband. She started a fresh course of studies there, the only woman at the university at that time, working together with Theodor Boveri. They married on 4 October 1897 at the Convent of the Good Shepherd in Troy, New York. Her daughter Margret was born on 14 August 1900.

Much of her work was done in collaboration with her husband and her career followed a pattern different from women scientists of her generation.

Her husband died in 1915, from tuberculosis, which Marcella was convinced was aggravated by stress due to the First World War. She returned to the United States in 1925, where she worked at Albertus Magnus College until 1942. While there she translated The Origin of Malignant Tumors, an important book which she had co-written with her husband. She died in 1950 in Trenton, New Jersey.

References

American geneticists
1863 births
1950 deaths
Massachusetts Institute of Technology alumni
Harvard University alumni
Vassar College faculty
Bryn Mawr College faculty
American people of Irish descent
American expatriates in Germany
People from Boston
19th-century American scientists
20th-century American biologists
19th-century American women scientists
20th-century American women scientists
Bryn Mawr School people
Albertus Magnus College faculty
American women academics
American women geneticists
Girls' High School (Boston, Massachusetts) alumni